Antonello da Caserta, also Anthonello de Casetta, Antonellus Marot, was an Italian composer of the medieval era, active in the late 14th and early 15th centuries.

Life and career
Essentially nothing is known of Antonello's life. Earlier in the 20th century, Nino Pirrotta thought Caserta was a Neapolitan composer, but because most of his surviving works are in northern Italian manuscripts, this is now doubted . Allusions in his texts suggest that he worked for the Visconti family in Milan around the turn of the 15th century , and a "frater Antoniello de Caserta" mentioned in an archival document may indicate that he was at the Visconti curt in Pavia in 1402 . Antonello was a monk, though the order to which he belonged is not known.

Music
Antonello da Caserta is one of the more renowned composers of the generation after Guillaume de Machaut. Antonello set texts in both French and Italian, including Beauté parfaite of Machaut; this is the only surviving musical setting of a poem by Machaut which is not by Machaut himself. He was highly influenced by French musical models, one of the first Italians to be so. One of his ballades quotes Jehan Vaillant, a composer active in Paris. He also made use of irregular mensuration signs, found in few other manuscripts. He also uses proportional rhythms in some ballades, a device which became more popular in later periods. His Italian works tend to be simpler, especially the ballate. Both his French and Italian works take as their subjects courtly love.

Works

French
(all for three voices)
Ballades
Amour m'a le cuer mis
Beauté parfaite
Dame d'onour en qui
Du val prilleus (or Du ciel perileus)
Notes pour moi ceste ballade
Nulle pitie de ma dame (possibly by Antonello)

Rondeaux
Dame d'onour c'on ne puet esprixier
Dame zentil en qui est ma sperance

Virelai
Tres nouble dame souverayne

Italian
(all for two voices)
Ballatas
A pianger l'ochi
Con dogliosi martire
Deh, vogliateme oldire
Madonna, io me ramento
Or tolta pur me sey
Più chiar ch'el sol (with a fragmentary third voice)

Madrigal
Del glorioso titolo d'esto duce

References

Further reading
Günther, Ursula. 1990. "Polymetric Rondeaux from Machaut to Dufay". In Studies in Musical Sources and Style: Essays in honor of Jan LaRue, edited by Edward H. Roesner and Eugene K. Wolf, 75–108. Madison, WI: A-R Editions. .
Günther, Ursula/Anne Stone. "Antonello da Caserta". The New Grove Dictionary of Music and Musicians online.

Italian male classical composers
Trecento composers
Year of birth unknown
Year of death unknown
15th-century Italian composers
Medieval male composers